The following is a list of episodes of the television series The Tonight Show Starring Johnny Carson which aired in 1963:

January

February

March

April

May

June

July

August

September

October

November

NOTE: 11/22 broadcast cancelled due to the assassination of John F. Kennedy. Scheduled guests for 11/22 were actor Kirk Douglas, comedian Henny Youngman, singing group The Willis Sisters and actor/comedian Dave King

December

References

Tonight Show Starring Johnny Carson, The
Tonight Show Starring Johnny Carson, The
The Tonight Show Starring Johnny Carson